Security forces in Israel (also known as Israel security establishment, Ma'arechet ha'Bitachon) include a variety of organizations, including military, law enforcement, paramilitary, governmental, and intelligence agencies.

Military
Israel Defense Forces: Israel's Defense forces, comprising the Ground Forces, Air Force and Navy.

Police

Israel Police: a civilian force. As with most other police forces in the world, its duties include crime fighting, traffic control and maintaining public safety.

Civil Guard (Mishmar Ezrahi): A volunteer organization of Israeli citizens which assists in daily police work. It is a subdivision of the Israel Police.
Border Police (Magav): the military branch (gendarmerie) of the Israeli Police.

Intelligence

 Shabak (Israel Security Agency) Sherut HaBitahon HaKlali ("General Security Agency"): the organization responsible for internal security, including in the Israeli-occupied territories.
 Mossad (The Institute) HaMosad LeModi'in VLeTafkidim Meyuhadim ("The Institute for Intelligence and for Special Tasks"): the agency responsible for foreign intelligence.
Aman (Directorate of Military Intelligence) Agaf HaModi'in: Military intelligence, or Aman, produces comprehensive national intelligence estimates for the prime minister and cabinet, daily intelligence reports, risk of war estimates, target studies on nearby countries, and communications intercepts. Aman also conducts across-border agent operations. Aman is an independent service, co-equal with the army, navy and air force. Aman has an estimated staff of 7,000.

Emergency services
 Magen David Adom (Red Shield of David): Magen David Adom (MDA) is made up of volunteer and professional medical responders and provides the Israel's pre-hospital emergency medical needs, including disaster, ambulance, and blood services. 
 Israel Fire and Rescue Services: They are responsible for extinguishing fires and extracting people trapped in structures (ranging from stuck elevators to collapsed buildings).
 Home Front Command: part of the IDF. A military rescue team which handles large-scale civilian disasters such as earthquakes, collapsed buildings and missile attacks on cities.
 Unit 669: the Israeli Air Force airborne medevac extraction unit.
 11 Local Rescue teams in the Golan Heights, Galilee-Carmel, Jezreel Valley, Samaria, Ein Gedi, Megilot, Gush Etzion, Arad, Negev, Arava, and Eilat-Eilot.

Other organizations
Israel Prison Service: Sherut Batei ha-Sohar: The Israel Prison Service (IPS), sometimes called by its acronym SHABAS, is a security organization which is an integral part of Israel's system of law enforcement. Its chief roles include the holding of prisoners and detainees under secure and suitable conditions, while preserving their dignity, and meeting their basic needs.  The IPS coordinates with relevant national, regional and municipal authorities and organizations.
Knesset Guard: The Knesset has its own guard and usher unit, headed by the Sergeant-at-Arms. The Knesset Guard is in charge of security in the Knesset compound and building.  The Serjeant-at-Arms ("Katzin ha-Knesset") is the commander of the Knesset Guard.

References

External links
Israeli Weapons (unofficial website)
isayeret.com - Israeli Special Forces Database 
Israeli Intelligence Legacy Center (Hebrew)
Shin Bet (FAS)